Fry's Hamlet Historic District is a historic district in East Greenwich, Rhode Island. The central characteristic of the district is a cluster of three farmsteads, including four primary dwellings, four barns, and numerous additional outbuildings. Three of the four houses were built in the 18th century, and are associated with the Fry and Spencer families that long farmed this area.

The district was listed on the National Register of Historic Places in 1985.

See also
National Register of Historic Places listings in Kent County, Rhode Island

References

External links

Historic districts in Kent County, Rhode Island
East Greenwich, Rhode Island
Historic American Buildings Survey in Rhode Island
Historic districts on the National Register of Historic Places in Rhode Island
National Register of Historic Places in Kent County, Rhode Island